Ivan Antic (1923–2005) was a Serbian architect and academic, considered one of Yugoslavia's best post-World War II architects. He worked on several projects with architect Ivanka Raspopović.

Biography 
He studied in Belgrade from 1945 until graduating in 1950. While studying, he worked for the Ministry of Transportation and from 1950 until 1953 he worked for the "Jugoprojekt Office" where he met people like Stanko Kliska and Vojin Simeonović (both famous architects in former Yugoslavia) where he learned the practical skills of his profession. After 1957 he started to design his own projects and after that he joined the University of Belgrade Faculty of Architecture, in first as an assistant and later as a professor. He was a member of the Serbian Academy (SANU) and his buildings are considered masterpieces of Serbian modern architecture: they are functional and aesthetic.
Antic died in Belgrade in 2005.

Architecture 
Some of his famous works are:

 Museum of Contemporary Art, Belgrade, Serbia (co-designed with Ivanka Raspopović)
 Sport-Recreational Center "25 May", Belgrade, Serbia
 21 October Museum in Šumarice Memorial Park, Kragujevac, Serbia (co-designed with Ivanka Raspopović)

External links 
 Architecture

References 

1923 births
2005 deaths
Academic staff of the University of Belgrade
University of Belgrade Faculty of Architecture alumni
Brutalist architects
20th-century Serbian people
Architects from Belgrade
Yugoslav architects